The Azalea Court Apartments is a historic three-story apartment building located in Mobile, Alabama.  It was built in 1928 and was designed by architect J. Platt Roberts in the Spanish Colonial Revival style.  It was added to the National Register of Historic Places on February 11, 1988.

References

Apartment buildings in Alabama
Residential buildings on the National Register of Historic Places in Alabama
Residential buildings completed in 1928
Spanish Revival architecture in Alabama
National Register of Historic Places in Mobile, Alabama